The Tennessee Division of Archaeology maintains a database of all archaeological sites recorded within the state of Tennessee. As of January 1, 2009 this catalog contains more than 22,000 sites, including both prehistoric and historic resources. In Tennessee, Prehistoric is generally defined as the time between the appearance of the first people in the region (c. 12,000 BC) and the arrival of the first European explorers (c. 1540 AD). The Historic period begins after the arrival of those Europeans and continues to the present. Both these periods are further divided into subperiods and phases using established archaeological conventions for the region.

The following list of archaeological sites in Tennessee encompasses sites that have either contributed substantially or have the potential to contribute substantially to research regarding people who have lived in what is now Tennessee. Note that a historical site is not necessarily an archaeological site. According to the Tennessee Division of Archaeology Site Survey Record, official site numbers are generally assigned to historic sites only if artifacts and/or historic documentation for that site support a pre–1933 date. Historical sites are included in the following list only if archeological field work has been conducted at the site.

The term cultural affiliation refers to the archaeological period when a site was created and/or occupied. Many sites were occupied during more than one archaeological period, and are therefore known as multicomponent. An example of a multicomponent site would be American Civil War earthworks constructed at the same location as a prehistoric Mississippian village. The cultural affiliation category in the list below refers only to periods in which the most significant occupation or event (e.g., a battle) took place at the site.

Archaeological sites recorded in Tennessee are assigned State Trinomials consisting of letter and number combinations that indicate the state and county where the site is found, and includes a sequential number identifying the specific site. For example, the trinomial 40DV11 designates the eleventh archaeological site recorded in Davidson County (DV) , Tennessee (40) .

Legend for cultural affiliations:

 Paleoindian — roughly 12,000 BC (and possibly earlier) to 8000 BC
 Archaic — c. 8000 BC to 1000 BC
 Woodland — c. 1000 BC - 1000 AD
 Mississippian — c. 900 to 1600 AD
 Cherokee — affiliated with proto-historic and historic Cherokee occupation (c. 1600-1800)
 British colonial — affiliated with Euro-American expansion, pre-1776.
 American — affiliated with Euro-American occupation or events post-1776

The sites are listed alphabetically by county.

Anderson County

Bedford County

Benton County

Bledsoe County

Blount County

Bradley County

Campbell County

Cannon County

Carroll County

Carter County

Cheatham County

Chester County

Claiborne County

Clay County

Cocke County

Coffee County

Crockett County

Cumberland County

Davidson County

DeKalb County

Decatur County

Dickson County

Dyer County

Fayette County

Fentress County

Franklin County

Gibson County

Giles County

Grainger County

Greene County

Grundy County

Hamblen County

Hamilton County

Hancock County

Hardeman County

Hardin County

The Holliston Mills site, a Mississippian town in Upper East Tennessee, is located on the north bank of the Holston River south of Kingsport in Hawkins County, Tennessee. The site was excavated by members of the Tennessee Archaeological Society between 1968 and 1972. It was excavated in ten-foot blocks using six-inch levels, revealing a large late prehistoric (and perhaps protohistoric) town represented by at least two palisades, more than 660 burials, a large public structure, and several smaller domestic structures. The excavators initially reported the recovery of what they believed to be Cobb Island pottery in the plow zone and much Dallas material from the level excavations, but they also noted that the site had been looted prior to their excavations. There is little, if any, Cobb Island pottery, but there are some Pisgah ceramics.

Hawkins County

Haywood County

Henderson County

Henry County

Hickman County

Houston County

Humphreys County

Jackson County

Jefferson County

Johnson County

Knox County

Lake County

Lauderdale County

Lawrence County

Lewis County

Lincoln County

Loudon County

Macon County

Madison County

Marion County

Marshall County

Maury County

McMinn County

McNairy County

Meigs County

Monroe County

Montgomery County

Moore County

Morgan County

Obion County

Overton County

Perry County

Pickett County

Polk County

Putnam County

Rhea County

Roane County

Robertson County

Rutherford County

Scott County

Sequatchie County

Sevier County

Shelby County

Smith County

Stewart County

Eastman Rockshelter
Sullivan County, TN

Sullivan County

Sumner County

Tipton County

Trousdale County

Unicoi County

Union County

Van Buren County

Warren County

Washington County

Wayne County

Weakley County

White County

Williamson County

Wilson County

Location not publicized

See also
Tennessee Division of Archaeology

History of Tennessee

Notes

Resources
 Frank H. McClung Museum
 The Tennessee Encyclopedia of History and Culture
 Tennessee Archaeology: A Synthesis
 Tennessee Archaeology Network
 Southeastern Archaeological Center Outline of Prehistory and History
 Archaeological Investigations in the Tims Ford Reservoir, Tennessee, 1966

Archaeological